Akchishma (Aqşişmä) is a rural locality (a village) in Khalikeyevsky Selsoviet, Sterlibashevsky District, Bashkortostan, Russia. The population was 41 as of 2010. There are 3 streets.

Geography 
Akchishma is located 16 km southwest of Sterlibashevo (the district's administrative centre) by road. Amirovo is the nearest rural locality.

References 

Rural localities in Sterlibashevsky District